Laurence Ivor Juber (born 12 November 1952) is an English musician, fingerstyle guitarist and studio musician. He played guitar in the rock band Wings from 1978 to 1981.

Biography

Early life
Born in Stepney, East London, Juber was raised and went to school in North London.  By his own account, he began playing guitar the week that single "I Want to Hold Your Hand" by The Beatles was released. Beginning on a cheap acoustic guitar, he learned to read music early and the system of music notation. He began to earn money playing the guitar at 13, and began to study classical guitar at the age of 15.

Studio work in London
Enraptured by the sounds on records of the mid- to late 1960s, he set his sights on becoming a session guitarist in London's music studios. While playing with the National Youth Jazz Orchestra, he earned his music degree at London University's Goldsmiths College, where he expanded his horizons by playing the lute. Upon graduation, he immediately began work as a session guitarist, working on his first project with former Beatles producer George Martin on an album for Cleo Laine. In 1977, Juber was booked, along with session drummer Peter Boita, by London-based orchestral contractor David Katz to go to Paris for a week to record Je n'ai pas vu le temps passer... with Charles Aznavour in Barclay Records' studios. Sung entirely in French, the album went on to become one of Aznavour's biggest selling French language albums.

During this time, Juber worked on the 1977 James Bond film The Spy Who Loved Me, as well the first Alan Parsons Project album, Tales of Mystery and Imagination.

Wings
Juber gave up a lucrative and successful studio career when invited to join the band Paul McCartney and Wings in 1978. Juber later said that he agreed to join immediately "because you don't turn down that kind of job". He played on the band's Back to the Egg album (1979), as well as their subsequent UK tour. In 1980, he garnered his first Grammy Award, when Wings' track "Rockestra Theme" won the award for Best Rock Instrumental. He was miscredited as Lawrence Tuber on the sleeve for Ringo Starr's album, Stop and Smell the Roses.  From this period dates his first solo album, Standard Time (only released on vinyl). McCartney and former Wings guitarist Denny Laine played on the track "Maisie". Juber acknowledges that whilst he was a sideman with Wings, the role included considering himself a member of the band.

Life after Wings
After Wings disbanded in early 1981, Juber moved to the United States. In New York City, he met his future wife, Hope, and soon moved to her native California.  He subsequently resumed work as a studio musician and played guitar for numerous television shows, including Happy Days, Family Ties, Home Improvement and 7th Heaven. He composed the music for A Very Brady Christmas (1988), World Gone Wild (1988) and Little Sweetheart (1990). He played guitar on Belinda Carlisle's "Mad About You", Eric Carmen's "Make Me Lose Control" and "Time of My Life" and "She's Like the Wind" from the Dirty Dancing soundtrack.

Juber co-composed the soundtrack of the award-winning video game Diablo III and crafted the score to the Dateline NBC documentary Children of the Harvest. His music is also featured in the Ken Burns TV documentary The Tenth Inning.

With his wife, Hope Juber, he has composed the scores to the musical comedies Gilligan's Island: The Musical, A Very Brady Musical and It's The Housewives!

In addition to his own recording and performances, Juber has produced, arranged and played on Al Stewart's albums Between the Wars (1995), Down in the Cellar (2000), A Beach Full of Shells (2005) and Sparks of Ancient Light (2008), and occasionally performs with Stewart.

In 2014 he released a "photo memoir" Guitar With Wings (published by Dalton Watson Fine Books) which featured previously unpublished pictures of his time working with Paul McCartney.

Solo career
In 1990, Juber released his second solo album, Solo Flight. During the next decade he would begin to explore altered tunings, especially "DADGAD". In 2000, Juber released the solo album LJ plays the Beatles and The Collection and in 2003 the album Guitarist was released to critical acclaim. Juber's credentials as a top-tier fingerstyle guitarist continue to grow. Having been voted "Guitarist of the Year" by readers of Fingerstyle Guitar magazine, as well as one of the top acoustic players of all time by Acoustic Guitar magazine, Juber is an ambassador for his instrument as well as his own music. He has released many critically acclaimed solo albums, and has earned a second Grammy for Best Pop Instrumental for his solo guitar arrangement of "The Pink Panther Theme" on the CD Henry Mancini: Pink Guitar. Juber has also released a series of instructional CDs that teach basic music theory and arrangement techniques for guitarists and has three folios of his arrangements of pop songs published by Hal Leonard.

Personal life
Juber is married to former actress Hope Schwartz, whose father Sherwood was producer of Gilligan’s Island and The Brady Bunch—she was a guest multiple times on the latter show.  They have two daughters, Nico Juber and songwriter Ilsey Juber.

Discography

1982: Standard Time 
1990: Solo Flight
1993: Naked Guitar
1995: LJ 
1997: Winter Guitar
1997: Groovemasters with Preston Reed
1998: Mosaic
1999: Altered Reality
2000: LJ Plays the Beatles
2000: Naked Solos
2000: The Collection
2001: Different Times
2003: Guitarist
2004: Henry Mancini: Pink Guitar 
2005: One Wing
2006: I've Got the World on Six Strings
2007: PCH
2008: Pop Goes Guitar
2009: Wooden Horses
2010: LJ Plays the Beatles Vol. 2
2011: Children of the Harvest
2012: Soul of Light
2013: Catch LJ Live!
2013: Under an Indigo Sky
2015: Fingerboard Road
2016: Holidays & Hollynights
2017: LJ Can't Stop Playing the Beatles!
2018: Touchstones: The Evolution of Fingerstyle Guitar
2019: Downtown
2020: The Fab 4th

Collaborations 
 Nice to Be Around – Rosemary Clooney (1977)
 Stop and Smell the Roses – Ringo Starr (1981)
 The Four Sides of Buzzy Linhart - Buzzy Linhart (1982, EP)
 Belinda – Belinda Carlisle (1986)
 Barry Manilow – Barry Manilow (1989)
 Between the Wars - Al Stewart (1995)
 Musings - William Goldstein (2016)
 Unleash the Love – Mike Love (2017)
 Fine Line – Harry Styles (2019)

References

External links
Official site

Laurence Juber Interview - NAMM Oral History Library (2003)

1952 births
Living people
Musicians from London
People from Stepney
Alumni of Goldsmiths, University of London
Acoustic guitarists
English blues guitarists
English country guitarists
English expatriates in the United States
English folk guitarists
English jazz guitarists
English male guitarists
English rock guitarists
English session musicians
Fingerstyle guitarists
Lead guitarists
British male jazz musicians
Paul McCartney and Wings members